Mike Randal Colter (born August 26, 1976) is an American actor best known for his role as Luke Cage in the Marvel Cinematic Universe, appearing in the streaming television series Luke Cage (2016–2018), The Defenders (2017), and Jessica Jones (2015; 2019). He has also appeared as Lemond Bishop in the television series The Good Wife (2010–2015) and The Good Fight (2018–2019), Malcolm Ward in Ringer (2011–2012), Jameson Locke in the Halo franchise (2014–2015), Agent J's father in Men in Black 3, and David Acosta, a former journalist studying to be a Catholic priest in the CBS/Paramount+ series Evil.

Early life
Colter was born in Columbia, South Carolina the youngest of four children born to Eddie Lee, Sr. and Freddie Marion (née Mitchell) Colter grew up in St. Matthews, South Carolina. He is a graduate of Calhoun County High School. In his senior high school yearbook, his senior superlative as voted by the class was "most ambitious." Colter spent a year at Benedict College before transferring to the University of South Carolina, receiving a bachelor's degree in theater in 1999. He obtained an MFA degree in acting from the Rutgers University Mason Gross School of the Arts.

Career
Colter's first role was in the film Million Dollar Baby as boxer Big Willie Little. He also guest starred on Law & Order: Trial By Jury, Law and Order: Criminal Intent, The Good Wife, ER, and The Parkers as well as several TV movies. He starred in the series Ringer.

In 2012, he was featured in the final act of the film Men in Black 3, playing agent J's father in the year 1969.

In 2014, Colter began portraying the role of Agent Jameson Locke in the Halo franchise. Colter starred in the series Halo: Nightfall and provided the motion capture for Agent Locke in Halo 5: Guardians, and the voice acting is performed by Ike Amadi. He also co-starred as Luke Cage in Jessica Jones on Netflix. The first season was released online on November 20, 2015. This was followed by the character's own series, Luke Cage, and the first season was released on September 30, 2016. The second season release followed on June 22, 2018. In between the two seasons, Colter also played Luke in The Defenders. He also starred in the 2018 alien invasion movie Extinction.

Colter was announced as the male lead in the CBS drama pilot, Evil as David Acosta, a Catholic seminarian who assesses unexplained phenomena for supernatural or scientific explanations.

In 2020, Colter starred in the Netflix anthology series Social Distance.

Personal life
Colter met his future wife, Iva, at Rutgers University in New Jersey, where they were both graduate students. The couple married in 2002. They have two daughters. Colter is a second cousin of actress Viola Davis. He resides in Los Angeles.

In 2019, Colter played for the "home" roster during the NBA All-Star Celebrity Game at the Bojangles' Coliseum in Charlotte, North Carolina. The roster was made up of celebrities with Carolina roots.

Filmography

Film and TV Movies

Television

Video games

Awards and nominations

References

External links

1976 births
21st-century American male actors
Male actors from Columbia, South Carolina
African-American male actors
American male film actors
American male television actors
Benedict College alumni
Living people
Male actors from New York (state)
Male actors from South Carolina
People from St. Matthews, South Carolina
Rutgers University alumni
University of South Carolina alumni
21st-century African-American people
20th-century African-American people